Tatiana Savostyanova is a visually impaired Russian Paralympic judoka. She represented Russia at the Summer Paralympics in 2004, 2008 and 2012 and she won one silver medal and two bronze medals at the Summer Paralympics.

At the 2015 IBSA European Judo Championships held in Odivelas, Portugal, she won the gold medal in the women's 70 kg event.

References

External links 
 

Living people
Year of birth missing (living people)
Place of birth missing (living people)
Russian female judoka
Judoka at the 2004 Summer Paralympics
Judoka at the 2008 Summer Paralympics
Judoka at the 2012 Summer Paralympics
Medalists at the 2004 Summer Paralympics
Medalists at the 2008 Summer Paralympics
Medalists at the 2012 Summer Paralympics
Paralympic silver medalists for Russia
Paralympic bronze medalists for Russia
Paralympic medalists in judo
Paralympic judoka of Russia
21st-century Russian women